Olifantskop Pass, (English: Elephant's Head), is situated in the Eastern Cape province of South Africa. It carries three to four lanes of road traffic on the N10 national road over the Suurberg mountains between Paterson and Cookhouse.

Mountain passes of the Eastern Cape